The 1916 Case Scientists football team represented the Case Institute of Technology during the 1916 college football season. The team compiled a 5–5 record and outscored their opponents 158 to 145.

Schedule

References

Case
Case Western Reserve Spartans football seasons
Case football